Šance Dam is a water reservoir and dam in the Moravian-Silesian Beskids mountain range, Moravian-Silesian Region, Czech Republic. The dam is built on upper course of the Ostravice River and has a surface of 3.37 km². It was constructed in 1964-1969 and began operating in 1974. Part of the village of Staré Hamry was demolished and subsequently flooded during the construction. The name of the dam comes from the hill that overlooks the dam.

The dam is used mainly to supply drinking water to nearby towns and villages and to subdue floods on the Ostravice River.

Footnotes

References 
 

Dams in the Czech Republic
Frýdek-Místek District
Cieszyn Silesia
Moravian-Silesian Beskids
Buildings and structures in the Moravian-Silesian Region
Dams completed in 1969